Pelz is a surname. It may refer to:
 Bruce Pelz (1936–2002), American science fiction fan
 Dave Pelz, American golf coach
 Dwight Pelz (born 1951), American politician who served as the Chair of the Washington State Democratic Party
 Josef Pelz von Felinau (1895–1978), Austrian writer
 Paul J. Pelz (1841–1918), German-American architect

See also
 Pelze, a short river of Saxony-Anhalt, Germany